Casino is an unincorporated community in May Township, Cass County, Minnesota, United States, near Motley and Pillager. It is along 49th Avenue SW (Cass County Road 104), near 104th Street SW.

References

Unincorporated communities in Cass County, Minnesota
Unincorporated communities in Minnesota